{Awayland} is the second studio album by Irish indie folk band Villagers, released on 11 January 2013 on Domino Records. Co-produced by band members Conor O'Brien and Tommy McLaughlin, the album was preceded by the single, "Nothing Arrived".

Like its predecessor, Becoming a Jackal (2010), the album has been nominated for the Mercury Prize.

Background and recording
During the writing and process for {Awayland}, primary songwriter Conor O'Brien was influenced by Radiohead, Aphex Twin, Tricky and Björk, noting, "I bought my first synthesizer and learned how to use that and got a drum machine and a sampler and started making terrible techno music. Slowly words started appearing out of all these ambient soundscapes I was making and then I picked up the acoustic again and learnt how to finger pick properly. The whole album is really a by-product of that steep learning curve." At one stage, O'Brien considered recording an instrumental album, inspired by electronica and Krautrock.

O'Brien subsequently spent the next year recording rough demos for the album, before rehearsing them with the rest of the band: guitarist Tommy McLaughlin, pianist Cormac Curran, bass guitarist Daniel Snow, and drummer James Byrne. O'Brien noted, "After a year of working on my own, I spent four days kicking them around with the band, and it just became more visceral and groovier. I got rid of most of the electronic beds that I had made the song on. Stripping things back exposed the lyrics a bit more. Sometimes you can throw too much at something, and it just becomes weaker."

The band spent five weeks recording the album in Donegal, Ireland, at live-in studio, Attica Audio Recording.

Writing and composition
Comparing {Awayland} to the band's predominately acoustic debut album, Becoming a Jackal (2010), primary songwriter Conor O'Brien noted, "After two years of touring, I started feeling like the worst writer in the world. There wasn't enough depth to maintain my interest every night. There’s no way I can sing “My love is selfish” a hundred time and it continue to feel pure and true. I felt, in a very childish way, I had romanticized sadness, and I was using the music to wallow. Even the acoustic guitar started sounding terrible to me."

O'Brien's initial demo recordings for the album ultimately differed from the final full band recordings. The track, "Passing a Message", was initially nine minutes long, with O'Brien describing it as "a big, ambient soundscape that peaked in the middle," which was inspired by astronomer Carl Sagan's writings. The album's first single, "Nothing Arrived", was at first, "a pretty mental, drum and bass electronica [song], [with] lyrics about cities crumbling and people dying, sounds of fire and apocalyptic things." After rehearsing the song with the rest of the band, the track became "a pretty straightforward folk rock song about smiling into the void."

Regarding his band mates contributions, O'Brien stated, "When I am on my own, it’s like an oil painting, I can put that on top of that and build up layers. But with the band, it turned out more watercolour, you’re leaving white bits of paper exposed, so that nothing is too overworked."

Critical reception

The album received mostly positive reviews, and holds a Metacritic score of 80 out of 100, based on 27 reviews.

AllMusic's Scott Kerr gave the album a positive review, praising the contributions of the full-band recording: "The songs feel fuller as a result, and without the burden of playing every instrument, the Irishman [Conor O'Brien] has concentrated his efforts into his lyrics. [...] The creative progression O'Brien exhibits here leaves no lingering questions of doubt whether he would succumb to the dreaded second album syndrome, and regardless of awards, {Awayland} sees the Irishman at his best, both musically and lyrically."

Writing for The Guardian, Dave Simpson issued the album with another positive review, stating: "The dazzling imagery comes with a rollercoasting voyage through acoustic soul, brass and – a new development – electronica. Drake's gentle, ghostly hand is most audible in the damaged beauty of the title track and depression-conquering "Rhythm Composer". The soaring "Waves" and joyful, piano-led Waterboysy stomp of "Nothing Arrived" may be the best Villagers tunes to date."

NMEs Lucy Jones gave the album a favourable review, paying praise to Conor O'Brien's vocals, stating that "O’Brien’s smiling-through-tears vocal that makes him sound like he’s going to explode with sorrow or joy at any minute is extraordinary."

Track listing
All songs written by Conor O'Brien.

Personnel

Villagers
 Conor O'Brien – lead vocals, acoustic guitar, electric guitar (7), percussion, beats & samples, synthesizers
 Tommy McLaughlin – electric guitar, backing vocals, mandolin
 Cormac Curran – piano, organ, synthesizers, backing vocals, string and brass arrangements 
 Danny Snow – bass guitar
 James Byrne – drums, percussion, lovely smile

Additional musicians
Sean McCarron – saxophone
Jacqueline McCarthy – French horn
Rich Hadwen - viola
Clare Hadwen - violin
Alys Jackson - violin
Claire Thatcher - violin
Fergus Fitzpatrick - cello

Recording personnel
Conor O'Brien - producer, mixing
Tommy McLaughlin - producer, mixing
Ian McNulty - additional engineering
Guy Davie - mastering

Artwork
Conor O'Brien - artwork, photography
Matthew Cooper - design
Rory McGuigan - additional design
Daniel Snow - photography
Enda Doran - photography
Mette Svendsen - photography

Chart positions

Certifications

References

2013 albums
Villagers (band) albums